August Satria Purnama or better known as August Melasz (born in Surabaya, East Java, Indonesia on November 30, 1951; age 67 years) is an Indonesian actor of mixed ethnic Dutch and Javanese descent.

Filmography
Pembalasan Naga Sakti (1976)
Gadis Kampus (1979)
Dr Siti Pertiwi Kembali ke Desa (1979)
Seputih Hatinya, Semerah Bibirnya (1982)
Di Balik Kelambu (1983) as Bakri
Five Deadly Angels (1983)
Noda X (1985)
Final Score (1986)
American Hunter (1988) as Johnny
Istana Kecantikan (1989)
Double Crosser (1990)
Zig Zag (1991)
Angel of Fury (1992) as Tony
Issue (2005) as Irwin
Dead Time: Kala (2007) as Hendro Waluyo
Mereka Bilang, Saya Monyet! (2008)

External links and sources 

1951 births
Indonesian male film actors
Living people
Javanese people
Indonesian people of Dutch descent
People from Surabaya